Neptis nicoteles, the clubbed sailer, is a butterfly in the family Nymphalidae. It is found in Sierra Leone, Liberia, Ivory Coast, Ghana, Nigeria, Cameroon, Gabon, the Republic of the Congo, Angola, the Democratic Republic of the Congo, Uganda, western Kenya, western Tanzania and north-western Zambia. The habitat consists of various types of forests, including secondary habitats.

The larvae feed on Millettia species.

References

Butterflies described in 1874
nicoteles
Butterflies of Africa
Taxa named by William Chapman Hewitson